Aydarken Botanical Reserve (also Хайдаркен Khaydarken) is a reserve located in Kadamjay District of Batken Region in Kyrgyzstan. It was established in 1975 to protect endemics tulips (Tulipa rosea Vved.). The reserve occupies 30 hectares.

References
 

Botanical reserves in Kyrgyzstan
Protected areas established in 1975